Tully Friedman (born January 1942) is an American businessman. A founding partner of Hellman & Friedman, as of 2013 he was chief executive of Friedman, Fleischer and Lowe, a San Francisco-based private equity firm.

Early life
He graduated from Stanford University and received a J.D. from the Harvard Law School.

Career
He was managing director of Salomon Brothers, where he founded its West Coast Corporate Finance Department and served on its national Corporate Finance Administrative Committee.

In 1984, he and Warren Hellman founded Hellman & Friedman, an investment company.

Since 1997, he has served as chairman and CEO of Friedman Fleischer & Lowe, a private equity firm.

Board memberships and philanthropy
He sits on the boards of Clorox, Kool Smiles, NCDR, Church's Chicken, Cajun Operating Company, Archimedes Technology, and DPMS LLC. He previously served on the Boards of CapitalSource, Levi Strauss & Co., Mattel, and McKesson Corporation. He is a former president of the San Francisco Opera Association and chairman of Mount Zion Hospital and Medical Center. He is also chairman of the board of trustees of the American Enterprise Institute. He also sits on the board of trustees of the Telluride Foundation in Telluride, Colorado.

Personal life
His first wife was Ann Fay Barry, granddaughter of Paul B. Fay. In 1995, he married Elise Dorsey in an Episcopal ceremony in Sonoma, California. Until November 2012, Friedman owned a neo-classical-style home in Woodside, California that was featured in the book, "Extraordinary Homes California: an Exclusive Showcase of the Finest Architects, Designers and Builders in California."

References

Stanford University alumni
Harvard Law School alumni
American businesspeople
Jewish American philanthropists
American Enterprise Institute
Living people
1942 births
People from Woodside, California
21st-century American Jews